Julien Dupré (March 18, 1851 – April, 1910) was a French painter.

He was born in Paris on March 18, 1851 to Jean Dupré (a jeweler) and Pauline Bouillié.  It was expected that he enter the family business, and to that end Dupré began working in a shop that sold lace.  However, his parents were forced to close their shop due to the war of 1870 and the siege of Paris.  With time on his hands, Dupré began taking evening courses at the Ecole des Arts Décoratifs and it was through these classes that he gained admission to the École Nationale et Spéciale des Beaux-Arts.

At l'Ecole he studied with Isidore Pils and Henri Lehmann. In the mid-1870s he traveled to Picardy and became a student of the rural genre painter Désiré François Laugée, whose daughter Marie Eléonore Françoise he married in 1876; the year he exhibited his first painting at the Paris Salon.

Dupré received a gold medal at the Exposition Universelle of 1889 in Paris.  In 1892, he was awarded the Legion of Honour.

Dupré was teacher to Lucy Scarborough Conant.

Throughout his career Dupré championed the life of the peasant and continued painting scenes in the areas of Normandy and Brittany.  He exhibited regularly until his death in April, 1910.

Works in public collections 

The Hay Harvest (1881) - Chimei Museum, Tainan, Taiwan (R.O.C.)
Haying Scene (1884) - St. Louis Art Museum, St. Louis, Missouri
The Haymakers (1886) - Worcester Art Museum, Worcester, Massachusetts
Return From the Fields (n.d.) - Joslyn Art Museum, Omaha, Nebraska
In Pasture (1882) - Washington University in St. Louis Art Gallery, St. Louis, Missouri
Haying Scene (1882) - Washington University in St. Louis Art Gallery, St. Louis, Missouri
Young Woman Watering Cattle - Museum of Fine Arts, Boston, Massachusetts
Haymaking (1892) - Museum of Fine Arts, Boston, Massachusetts
Children Feeding Geese (1881) - Museum of Fine Arts, Boston, Massachusetts
Peasant Girl with Sheep (n.d.) - The Fine Arts Museums of San Francisco, California
Milking Time (n.d.) - The Fine Arts Museums of San Francisco, California
Women in the Fields (n.d.) - Bowdoin College Museum of Art, Brunswick, Maine
The Young Shepherdess (n.d.) - San Diego Museum of Art, San Diego, California
In the Pasture (1883) - University of Kentucky Art Museum, Lexington. Kentucky
Le Ballon (1886) - Reading Public Museum and Art Gallery, Reading, Pennsylvania
The Harvesters (1885) - The Appleton Museum of Art, Ocala, Florida
The Harvester (c.1880/1) - Huntington Museum of Art, Huntington, West Virginia
Home From the Pasture (n.d.) - Columbia Museum of Art, Columbia, South Carolina
Woman Harvesting Hay (n.d.) - Museum of Fine Arts, Houston, Texas
The White Cow (La vache blanche) (ca. 1890) - Musée d'Orsay, Paris, France
Les faucheurs du luzerne (1880) - Musée d'Orsay, Paris, France

References

Bibliography

External links

Julien Dupré Catalogue Raisonné research conducted by Howard L. Rehs & Professor Janet Whitmore

1851 births
1910 deaths
Painters from Paris
19th-century French painters
French male painters
20th-century French painters
20th-century French male artists
French genre painters
Academic art
French Realist painters
19th-century French male artists